Placement Group A of the 1998 Fed Cup Asia/Oceania Zone Group II was one of six pools in the Asia/Oceania Zone Group II of the 1998 Fed Cup. The three teams that placed first in the initial pools competed in a round robin competition, with the top team advancing to the World Group II Play-offs.

India vs. Tajikistan

Pacific Oceania vs. India

Pacific Oceania vs. Tajikistan

  and  placed first and second in this pool, and thus advanced to Group I for 1999. India placed second in their pool of five, while Pacific Oceania placed last in their pool and thus were relegated back down to Group II for 2000.

See also
Fed Cup structure

References

External links
 Fed Cup website

1998 Fed Cup Asia/Oceania Zone